Girolamo Danti (1547 – 1580) was an Italian painter of the Renaissance period, active in Perugia.  His brother Ignazio Danti was an Italian priest, mathematician, astronomer, and cosmographer.

References

1547 births
1580 deaths
People from Perugia
16th-century Italian painters
Italian male painters
Umbrian painters
Italian Renaissance painters